In macroeconomics, hard currency, safe-haven currency, or strong currency is any globally traded currency that serves as a reliable and stable store of value. Factors contributing to a currency's hard status might include the stability and reliability of the respective state's legal and bureaucratic institutions, level of corruption, long-term stability of its purchasing power, the associated country's political and fiscal condition and outlook, and the policy posture of the issuing central bank.

Safe haven currency is defined as a currency which behaves like a hedge for a reference portfolio of risky assets conditional on movements in global risk aversion. Conversely, a weak or soft currency is one which is expected to fluctuate erratically or depreciate against other currencies. Softness is typically the result of weak legal institutions and/or political or fiscal instability.

History 
The paper currencies of some developed countries have earned recognition as hard currencies at various times, including the United States dollar, euro, Japanese yen,  British pound sterling, Swiss franc  and to a lesser extent the Canadian dollar and Australian dollar.  As times change, a currency that is considered weak at one time may become stronger, or vice versa. 

One barometer of hard currencies is how they are favored within the foreign-exchange reserves of countries:

Turmoil 
The US dollar (USD) has been considered a strong currency for much of its history. Despite the Nixon shock of 1971, and the United States' growing fiscal and trade deficits, most of the world's monetary systems have been tied to the US dollar due to the Bretton Woods system and dollarization. Countries have thus been compelled to purchase dollars for their foreign exchange reserves, denominate their commodities in dollars for foreign trade, or even use dollars domestically, thus buoying the currency's value.

The euro (EUR) has also been considered a hard currency for much of its short history. However, the European sovereign debt crisis has partially eroded that confidence.

The Swiss franc (CHF) has long been considered a hard currency, and in fact was the last paper currency in the world to terminate its convertibility to gold on May 1, 2000, following a referendum. In the summer of 2011, the European sovereign debt crisis led to rapid flows out of the euro and into the franc by those seeking hard currency, causing the latter to appreciate rapidly. On September 6, 2011, the Swiss National Bank announced that it would buy an "unlimited" number of euros to fix an exchange rate at 1.00 EUR = 1.20 CHF, to protect its trade. This action temporarily eliminated the franc's hard currency advantage over the euro but was abandoned in January 2015.

Demand 
Investors as well as ordinary people generally prefer hard currencies to soft currencies at times of increased inflation (or, more precisely, times of increased inflation differentials between countries), at times of heightened political or military risk, or when they feel that one or more government-imposed exchange rates are unrealistic.  There may be regulatory reasons for preferring to invest outside one's home currency, e.g. the local currency may be subject to capital controls which makes it difficult to spend it outside the host nation.

For example, during the Cold War, the rouble in the Soviet Union was not a hard currency because it could not be easily spent outside the Soviet Union and because the exchange rates were fixed at artificially high levels for persons with hard currency, such as Western tourists.  (The Soviet government also imposed severe limits on how many roubles could be exchanged by Soviet citizens for hard currencies.)  After the fall of the Soviet Union in December 1991, the rouble depreciated rapidly, while the purchasing power of the US dollar was more stable, making it a harder currency than the rouble. A tourist could get 200 roubles per US dollar in June 1992, and 500 roubles per dollar in November 1992.

In some economies, which may be either planned economies or market economies using a soft currency, there are special stores that accept only hard currency.  Examples have included Tuzex stores in the former Czechoslovakia, Intershops in East Germany, Pewex in Poland, or Friendship stores in China in the early 1990s. These stores offer a wider variety of goods many of which are scarce or imported than standard stores.

Mixed currencies 
Because hard currencies may be subject to legal restrictions, the desire for transactions in hard currency may lead to a black market.  In some cases, a central bank may attempt to increase confidence in the local currency by pegging it against a hard currency, as is this case with the Hong Kong dollar or the Bosnia and Herzegovina convertible mark.  This may lead to problems if economic conditions force the government to break the currency peg (and either appreciate or depreciate sharply) as occurred in the 1998–2002 Argentine great depression.

In some cases, an economy may choose to abandon local currency altogether and adopt another country's currency as legal tender. Examples include the adoption of the US dollar in Panama, Ecuador, El Salvador and Zimbabwe and the adoption of the German mark and later the euro in Kosovo and Montenegro.

See also 

 Currency strength
 Fiat money
 Gold reserve
 Gold standard
 Silver standard
 Reserve currency
 Commodity currency
 Private currency
 Representative money
 Black Friday (1869)also referred to as the Gold Panic of 1869

References 

Currency
Monetary hegemony
Progressive Era in the United States